Roccatederighi is a village in Tuscany, central Italy,  administratively a frazione of the comune of Roccastrada, province of Grosseto. At the time of the 2001 census its population amounted to 846.

Roccatederighi is a hilly medieval village situated about 35 km from Grosseto and 11 km from Roccastrada.

Main sights 
 Church of San Martino (10th century), main parish church of the village
 Church of San Sebastiano (16th century), with a neo-classical facade of 1860.
 Walls of Roccatederighi, old fortifications which surround the village since 11th century
 Castle with clock tower, a 13th-century fortress

References

Bibliography 
 Aldo Mazzolai, Guida della Maremma. Percorsi tra arte e natura, Le Lettere, Florence, 1997.
 Giuseppe Guerrini, Torri e castelli della Provincia di Grosseto, Nuova Immagine Editrice, Siena, 1999.

See also 
 Montemassi
 Piloni
 Ribolla
 Sassofortino
 Sticciano
 Torniella

Frazioni of Roccastrada